Jiří Kučera (born March 28, 1966) is a Czech professional ice hockey coach and former player. He is currently the head coach of HC Litvinov. During his playing career he played for HC Plzen and Dukla Jihlava in his home country and for Tappara in Finland, Luleå HF in Sweden, and EHC Kloten in Switzerland. He also represented the national team of either Czechoslovakia or Czech Republic eight times in the Ice Hockey World Championships and once in the Olympic Games.

Honors
 Ice Hockey World Championships: Gold (1996)
 Ice Hockey World Championships: Bronze (1987, 1989, 1990, 1993)
 Swedish national championship: gold (1996)

Career statistics

Regular season and playoffs

International

References

External links

1966 births
Living people
Czechoslovak ice hockey centres
Czech ice hockey centres
HC Plzeň players
HC Dukla Jihlava players
Ice hockey players at the 1994 Winter Olympics
Olympic ice hockey players of the Czech Republic
Pittsburgh Penguins draft picks
Sportspeople from Plzeň
Tappara players
Czechoslovak expatriate sportspeople in Finland
Czech expatriate ice hockey players in Sweden
Czech expatriate ice hockey players in Switzerland
Czech expatriate ice hockey players in Finland
Czechoslovak expatriate ice hockey people